The Invisible War is a 2012 documentary film.

Invisible War may also refer to:
Deus Ex: Invisible War, a 2003 video game
Immortal: The Invisible War, a 1993 role-playing game